Tan Ying may refer to:

 Tan Ying (actress) (1915-2001), Chinese film actress
 Tan Ying (softball) (born 1982), Chinese softball player
 Tan Ying (water polo) (born 1987), Chinese female water polo player